Tamar Ish-Shalom (Hebrew: תמר איש-שלום) is an Israeli journalist and television presenter. She currently serves as a newsanchor for Channel 13.

In 2011 she began presenting the weekly News10 for Channel 13 after Miki Haimovich said she would retire.

References

External links
http://www.nana10.co.il/Article/?ArticleID=794962 
http://e.walla.co.il/item/1831854 
http://www.ynet.co.il/articles/0,7340,L-4459326,00.html 

Israeli journalists
Living people
1981 births
Tel Aviv University alumni
Alumni of King's College London